Ellen Goosenberg Kent is an American film producer and director. She is best known for directing and co-producing documentary film Crisis Hotline: Veterans Press 1 (2013), which won the Academy Award for Best Documentary (Short Subject) at the 87th Academy Awards; the win was shared with producer Dana Perry. Throughout her career, she has worked on numerous films, mostly on television documentaries, including I Have Tourette's but Tourette's Doesn't Have Me (2005) and Alive Day Memories: Home from Iraq (2007). She has won four Emmy awards out of six nominations for her work on HBO.

References

External links 
 

American film directors
American film producers
Living people
Year of birth missing (living people)